Kalkowshavand-e Vosta (also Romanized as Kalkowshavand-e Vosţá; also known as Kalkoshavand-e Vosţá and Kalkowshavand-e Mīānī) is a village in Howmeh Rural District, in the Central District of Harsin County, Kermanshah Province, Iran. At the 2006 census, its population was 128, in 24 families.

References 

Populated places in Harsin County